House of Ricordi is a 1954 French-Italian historical melodrama film based on the early history of the Italian music publishing house Casa Ricordi. It is directed by Carmine Gallone and stars Märta Torén, Marcello Mastroianni and Micheline Presle. The Ricordi family's interactions with many of the great composers of the nineteenth century are portrayed. The film's sets were designed by Mario Chiari. It was shot at the Cinecittà Studios and on location in Milan, Paris and Rome.

Main cast

 Roland Alexandre as Gioacchino Rossini
 Myriam Bru  as Luisa Lewis
 Elisa Cegani  as  Giuseppina Strepponi
 Andrea Checchi  as  Giulio Ricordi
 Danièle Delorme as  Maria
 Gabriele Ferzetti  as Giacomo Puccini
 Fosco Giachetti  as  Giuseppe Verdi
 Renzo Giovampietro  as  Tito Ricordi
 Nadia Gray  as  Giulia Grisi
 Roldano Lupi  as Domenico Barbaja
 Marcello Mastroianni  as  Gaetano Donizetti
 Micheline Presle as  Virginia Marchi
 Maurice Ronet  as  Vincenzo Bellini
 Paolo Stoppa  as  Giovanni Ricordi
 Märta Torén as  Isabella Colbran (credited as Marta Toren)
 Fausto Tozzi as  Arrigo Boito 
 Julien Carette as  Felix 
 Memmo Carotenuto as  lo stuccatore
 Lauro Gazzolo as  carrettiere di Casa Ricordi
 Renato Malavasi as  Ambrogi
 Aldo Ronconi as  tenor Maselli
 Vira Silenti as  Marietta Ricordi
 Aldo Silvani as  Bellini's doctor	
 Sergio Tofano as  Cesarini Sforza 
 Antoine Balpêtré as  Dr. Fleury 
 Nelly Corradi	
 Claudio Ermelli

References

External links

1954 films
1950s historical musical films
French historical musical films
Italian historical musical films
1950s Italian-language films
Films directed by Carmine Gallone
Films about composers
Films set in the 19th century
Films set in Italy
Films shot in Italy
Cultural depictions of Giuseppe Verdi
Films shot at Cinecittà Studios
Minerva Film films
Films scored by Renzo Rossellini
Melodrama films
1950s Italian films
1950s French films